Anton Winkler (23 February 1954 – 8 October 2016) was a West German luger who competed during the late 1970s and early 1980s. He won the bronze medal in the men's singles event at the 1980 Winter Olympics in Lake Placid, New York.

Winkler also won three medals at the FIL World Luge Championships with a silver (singles: 1978) and two bronzes (singles: 1977, doubles: 1979). Additionally, he won a gold medal in the men's singles event at the 1977 FIL European Luge Championships in Königssee, West Germany. Winkler was the first men's singles Luge World Cup overall champion in 1977-78.

Winkler died on 8 October 2016.

References
FIL-Luge.org 13 October 2016 article on Winkler's passing. - accessed 15 October 2016.

1954 births
2016 deaths
German male lugers
Lugers at the 1976 Winter Olympics
Lugers at the 1980 Winter Olympics
Olympic bronze medalists for West Germany
Olympic lugers of West Germany
Olympic medalists in luge
Medalists at the 1980 Winter Olympics
People from Berchtesgadener Land
Sportspeople from Upper Bavaria